Robert Bale  may refer to:

Robert Bale (chronicler) ( 1461), English chronicler
Robert Bale (monk) (died 1503), English Carmelite friar and scholar